The year 1818 in architecture involved some significant events.

Events
 Church Building Act in the United Kingdom makes available £1 million for the construction of new Anglican "Commissioners' churches" to serve the expanding urban population.

Buildings and structures

Buildings

 Hazuri Bagh Baradari, Lahore, Punjab, built.
 Chapel of St John the Evangelist, Edinburgh, Scotland, designed by William Burn, dedicated.
 Church of Saint Peter, Wilmington, Delaware, designed by Pierre Bauduy, dedicated
 Trinity House of Leith, Scotland, designed by Thomas Brown, completed.
 The Holme in Regent's Park, London, built by Decimus Burton as a house for his father James Burton.
 "Ware's Folly" in Augusta, Georgia, United States, completed as a house for Nicholas Ware at enormous cost.
 First National Theatre Munich, Bavaria, designed by Karl von Fischer, opened.
 The Royal Coburg Theatre, London, opened.
 The Savannah Theatre, Savannah, Georgia, United States, designed by William Jay, opened.
 Teatro Nuovo, Pesaro, Papal States of Italy, opened as an opera house.
 Whitworth Bridge, Dublin, Ireland, designed by George Knowles, opened.

Awards
 Grand Prix de Rome, architecture: no first prize awarded.

Births
 May 17 – William Hay, Scottish  architect (died 1888)
 June 20 – Eugenius Birch, English civil engineer specialising in seaside pleasure piers (died 1884)
 July 22 – Thomas Stevenson, Scottish civil engineer specialising in lighthouses (died 1887)
 November 11 – James Renwick, Jr., American architect (died 1895)
 Thomas Mainwaring Penson, English architect (died 1864)
 Louis-Daniel Perrier, Swiss architect (died 1903)

Deaths
 April 25 – Johan Martin Quist, Danish architect (born 1755)
 May 1 – François-Joseph Bélanger, French neoclassical architect (born 1744)

References

Architecture
Years in architecture
19th-century architecture